The greater yellow-shouldered bat (Sturnira magna) is a species of bat in the family Phyllostomidae. It is found in Bolivia, Colombia, Ecuador, and Peru.

References

Sturnira
Mammals of Colombia
Mammals described in 1966
Taxonomy articles created by Polbot
Bats of South America